David Servan-Schreiber (April 21, 1961 – July 24, 2011) was a French physician, neuroscientist and author. He was a clinical professor of psychiatry at the University of Pittsburgh School of Medicine. He was also a lecturer in the Faculty of Medicine of Université Claude Bernard Lyon 1.

Life and career
Servan-Schreiber was born in Neuilly-sur-Seine, Hauts-de-Seine, the eldest son of French journalist and politician Jean-Jacques Servan-Schreiber (1924–2006). He became co-founder and then director of the Centre for Integrative Medicine at the University of Pittsburgh Medical Center. Following his volunteer activity as a physician in Iraq in 1991, he was one of the founders of the US branch of Médecins Sans Frontières, the international organization that was awarded the Nobel Peace Prize in 1999. He also served as volunteer in Guatemala, Kurdistan, Tajikistan, India and Kosovo.

In 2002 he was awarded the Pennsylvania Psychiatric Society Presidential Award for Outstanding Career in Psychiatry. He is the author of Healing Without Freud or Prozac (translated in 29 languages, 1.3 million copies sold), and Anticancer: A New Way of Life (translated in 35 languages, New York Times best-seller, 1 million copies in print) in which he discloses his own diagnosis with a malignant brain tumor at the age of 31 and the treatment programme that he put together to help himself beyond his surgery, chemotherapy and radiotherapy.

He was also a regular columnist for Ode magazine and other publications.

Later life and death
Having been treated twice for a malignant brain tumor, Servan-Schreiber  became a leading figure in his engagement for integrative approaches to the prevention and treatment of cancer. He popularized his knowledge through teaching seminars, lectures, books, a blog and audiobooks. However he died of brain cancer in Fécamp on July 24, 2011, almost 20 years after his cancer diagnosis.

Bibliography 
Anticancer - Prévenir et lutter grâce à nos défenses naturelles (Paris: Éditions Robert Laffont, 2007) 
On peut se dire au revoir plusieurs fois (Paris: Éditions Robert Laffont, 2011) 
Healing Without Freud or Prozac (Rodale Books, 2011) 
The Instinct to Heal: Curing Depression, Anxiety, and Stress Without Drugs and Without Talk Therapy (Rodale Books, 2004) (original: Guérir le stress, l’anxiété et la depression sans médicaments ni psychanalyse, 2003, edition Roberts Laffont, Paris)

References

External links 
 anticancerbook.com Website in english on "Anticancer" -- includes his regular blog
 http://www.csicop.org/si/show/clear_thinking_about_cancer
  Guerir.fr - Website

1961 births
2011 deaths
Carnegie Mellon University alumni
Carnegie Mellon University faculty
French psychiatrists
French medical writers
People from Neuilly-sur-Seine
University of Pittsburgh faculty
Université Laval alumni